This list of the prehistoric life of New Hampshire contains the various prehistoric life-forms whose fossilized remains have been reported from within the US state of New Hampshire.

Precambrian

The Paleobiology Database records no known occurrences of Precambrian fossils in New Hampshire.

Paleozoic
 †Acrospirifer
 †Acrospirifer murchisoni – or unidentified comparable form
  †Atrypa
 †Atrypa reticularis – or unidentified comparable form
 †Coelospira
 †Cyrtia – tentative report
 †Eospirifer
 †Howellella
 †Leptaena
 †Leptocoelia
 †Leptocoelia flabellites – or unidentified comparable form
 †Loxonema – or unidentified comparable form
 †Paleocyclas
 †Plectodonta
 †Protoleptostrophia
 †Resserella
 †Stricklandia
 †Tryplasma – tentative report

Mesozoic-Cenozoic
The Paleobiology Database records no known occurrences of Mesozoic or Cenozoic fossils in New Hampshire.

References
 

New Hampshire